Injected is the second album by the American band Phunk Junkeez. It was released in 1995 on Trauma Records/Interscope Records. 

"I Love It Loud" is a cover of the Kiss song; it peaked at No. 38 on Billboard'''s Modern Rock Tracks chart. The song appeared on the soundtrack to Tommy Boy.

Critical reception

The Tucson Weekly cautioned that the album may "sound numbingly derivative." The Chicago Sun-Times deemed it "high-energy, low-brain." The Sun-Herald'' praised the "booming hip hop rhythms and massive, distorted guitar riffs."

Track listing

References

1995 albums
Phunk Junkeez albums